Ace Drummond is a Universal Pictures 1936 film serial based on the comic strip "Ace Drummond" written by Captain Eddie Rickenbacker and drawn by Clayton Knight. The serial's cast  features John King, Jean Rogers, Noah Beery Jr. and Jackie Morrow, with Lon Chaney Jr. in a supporting role.

Plot
A mysterious villain who calls himself the Dragon is attempting to prevent International Airways from beginning service in Mongolia, in order to protect the secret of the mountain of jade for himself.

The serial features a dungeon in the nearby monastery, the kidnapping of an archeologist who stumbles onto the secret, his daughter's attempts to rescue him with Ace's help, a death ray the Dragon uses on the airline pilots, a radio system by which The Dragon communicates with his henchmen via the rotation of Buddhist prayer wheels (each transmission concluding "The Dragon commands!"), and a squadron of his own fighter planes.

Cast
John King as Ace Drummond
Jean Rogers as Peggy Trainor
Noah Beery Jr. as Jerry
Jackie Morrow as Billy Meredith
Selmer Jackson as Mr. Meredith
Guy Bates Post as the Grand Lama
C. Montague Shaw as Trainor
Frederick Vogeding as Bauer
Al Bridge as Wyckoff
Chester Gan as Kai-chek
James B. Leong as Henry Kee
James Eagles as Johnny Wong
Arthur Loft as Chang Ho
Lon Chaney Jr. as Henchman Ivan
Stanley Blystone as Henchman Sergei
Edmund Cobb as Henchman Nikolai
Richard Wessel as Henchman Boris

together with:  
Sam Ash as LePage; Hooper Atchley as Caldoni; Louis Vincenot as Lo Tan; Eddie Parker as Dmitri; Tom Steele and George De Normand as Other Henchman;
Russell Wade as Pilot; House Peters Jr. as Co-Pilot; Diana Gibson as Stewardess; and Ed Piel Sr. as Passenger.

Production
Ace Drummond was based on a comic strip by Captain Eddie Rickenbacker.

Ace Drummond gained good publicity following a set visit by Amelia Earhart.  The famous aviator had driven out to the San Fernando Valley, after hearing that the serial was being shot there on location, where she watched the filming of the chapter two cliffhanger.

In the traditional foreword at the beginning of each chapter, Ace Drummond used comic strips to summarise the story so far.  This worked well, and Universal who had been trying to get away from using written text in its forewords, used "similar gimmicks" in their succeeding serials.

Music
Ace also regularly performs his theme song, "Give Me a Ship and a Song".

Critical reception
In the words of Cline, Ace Drummond "exuded the futuristic aura of Flash Gordon combined with the eerie mystery of Baron Frankenstein's castle laboratory."

Chapter titles
 Chapter 1 - Where East Meets West
 Chapter 2 - The Invisible Enemy
 Chapter 3 - The Doorway of Doom
 Chapter 4 - The Radio Riddle
 Chapter 5 - Bullets of Sand
 Chapter 6 - Evil Spirits
 Chapter 7 - The Trackless Trail
 Chapter 8 - The Sign in the Sky
 Chapter 9 - Secret Service
 Chapter 10 - The Mountain of Jade
 Chapter 11 - The Dragon Commands
 Chapter 12 - The Squadron of Death
 Chapter 13 - The World's Akin
Source for titles:

See also
 List of American films of 1936

References

External links

 
 Ace Drummond at Internet Archive

1936 films
1936 adventure films
1930s spy films
American black-and-white films
American aviation films
American spy films
1930s English-language films
Films based on American comics
Films directed by Ford Beebe
Universal Pictures film serials
Articles containing video clips
American adventure films
1930s American films